The Brazilian gecko (Phyllopezus pollicaris) is a species of gecko, a lizard in the family Phyllodactylidae. The species is endemic to South America. The Brazilian Gecko feeds mostly on arthropods specifically Diptera.

Geographic range
P. pollicaris is found in Argentina, Bolivia, and Brazil. They can be found in a variety of places from Amazonia areas to also urban areas.

Description
Dorsally, P. pollicaris is gray-brown, with darker brown transverse band-like spots.

Reproduction
P. pollicaris is oviparous.

References

Further reading
Spix JB  (1825). Animalia nova sive species novae lacertarum, quas in itinere per Brasiliam annis MDCCCXVIII – MDCCCXX jussu et auspiciis Maximiliani Josephi I. Bavariae Regis suscepto collegit et descripsit. Munich: F.S. Hübschmann. Index + 26 pp. + Plates I-XXVIII. (Thecadactylus pollicaris, new species p. 17 + Plate XVIII, figure 2). (in Latin).

Phyllopezus
Reptiles of Brazil
Reptiles described in 1825